8 is the ninth studio album by Puerto Rican singer Luis Fonsi. He collaborated with Juan Luis Guerra in the song "Llegaste Tú", a song that Fonsi dedicated to Mikaela, his daughter. It was released on May 19, 2014, through Universal Music Latin Entertainment.

Track listing

 "Anónimos"
 "No Te Pertenece"
 "Corazón En La Maleta"
 "Que Quieres de Mí"
 "Somos Uno"
 "Regálame Un Minuto Más"
 "Cansada"
 "Llegaste Tú" (featuring Juan Luis Guerra)
 "Aprendí"
 "Cuando Me Dejes de Amar"
 "El Tren"
 "Un Presentimiento"
 "Tentación"
 "Solo Quiero Darte Amor"
 "Corazón Multicolor"

Charts

Weekly charts

Year-end charts

Sales and certifications

References

External links
 Official website

2014 albums
Luis Fonsi albums